Heterostasis is a moth genus, belonging to the family Tineidae. It contains only one species, Heterostasis extricata, which is found in the Democratic Republic of the Congo.

References

Myrmecozelinae
Monotypic moth genera
Lepidoptera of the Democratic Republic of the Congo
Moths of Africa
Endemic fauna of the Democratic Republic of the Congo